The Wier RDW-2 Draggin' Fly was a homebuilt light aircraft, designed in the United States in the 1970s, aimed at fairly inexperienced builders and flyers. Plans were available but only one was built.

Design and development
The Draggin' Fly was designed to be easy to build, to have good short field characteristics and to have control characteristics matched to the skills of less experienced pilots.  A four-cylinder Volkswagen air-cooled engine was selected for reliability and ease of maintenance.  The sole example was constructed over ten months without plans, though a rib jig and propeller plot were used. It was first flown in May 1972.

The Draggin' Fly had a constant chord parasol wing, built around two spruce spars and having slight dihedral.  The wing was Dacron covered and carried no flaps; the ailerons were aluminium with a full span torque tube.  It was held well above the fuselage on a pair of V-shaped bracing struts, assisted by inverted V-cabane struts fore and aft of the cockpit.  The fuselage was a steel tube structure and Dacron covered over the forward, pod like part that housed the engine and cockpit but open and triangular in section as it extended rearwards into a tailboom at cabane height.  The tail surfaces were again Dacron covered steel, wire braced with the tailplane placed at the bottom of the boom and with the lower rudder and a small ventral fin projecting below it.  The Draggin' Fly had a fixed tricycle undercarriage, the mainwheels mounted on two V-form struts and half-axles hinged to the fuselage underside.  All undercarriage legs used spring and rubber in compression type shock absorbers; the nose wheel was steerable.

For its first flight and first eight hours of flight testing the Draggin' Fly was powered by a 36 hp (29 kW), 1.2 L Volkswagen engine but this was then replaced by a more powerful Volkswagen variant producing 50 hp (37 kW). Plans for amateur building were produced in March 1974.

Specifications

References

External links
USA35B airfoil

Homebuilt aircraft
1970s United States sport aircraft
Parasol-wing aircraft
Aircraft first flown in 1972
Single-engined tractor aircraft